Shantou Metro, officially Shantou Rail Transit, is a monorail rapid transit system under construction in Shantou, Guangdong, China. Construction has started on a two-station test line between Shantou University and Xuelin Road, a route which will be part of Line 1 in the future. In the short term plan there will be three lines. The complete long-term plan for the system contains 8 lines and a total length of 230km.

History
Plans for a metro system to be built in Shantou date back to 2008. The system was approved by the municipal council in November 2016 and on December 28, 2016 construction commenced on the test section between Shantou University and Xuelin Road. Full-scale construction on the system has yet to begin due to Shantou not meeting the criteria required for building an urban rail transit system.

Lines

References 

Shantou
Rapid transit in China
Rail transport in Guangdong
Transport infrastructure under construction in China